Loudworks (formerly called Imaginarijum) is a Serbian dubbing studio of animated and live-action content.

Dubbing 
Studio Loudworks was founded in 2000 as a part of Luxor company. As of 2016, the name of the dubbing studio changed to Imaginarijum, but later it changed again to Loudworks.

Collaboration

TV channels 
  Ultra
  Mini
  RTS 1
  RTS 2
  BK TV
  A1
  Naša TV
  Pink
  Pink 2
  Pink super kids
  Pink kids
  Pikaboo
  RTV
  Happy Kids
  Studio B
  KCN Kopernikus
  Prva
  B92
  Kazbuka
  K1
  TV Avala
  Dexy TV
  Delta
  Minimax
  OBN
  RTRS
  Nickelodeon
  Nick Jr.

Publishing houses 
 A.S.F internacional
 BDR Media
 Gold Audio Video
 Dexy Co.
 Luxor
 Pro Vision
 Promaks film
 Sun promo
 Tisak
 Union Film

Companies 
 The Walt Disney Company

Content

Animated and live-action series 
 Angela Anaconda (Serbian: Anđela Anakonda)
 Angelina Ballerina (Serbian: Andželina balerina)
 Atomic Betty (Serbian: Atomik Beti)
 The Backyardigans (Serbian: Društvance za dvorištvance)
 Barbie: Life in the Dreamhouse (Serbian: Barbi: Život u kući snova)
 Ben and Holly's Little Kingdom (Serbian: Ben i Holi)
 Bratz
 Chuggington (Serbian: Čagington)
 Johnny Test (Serbian: Džoni Test)
 Phineas and Ferb (Serbian: Fića i Feđa)
 Fifi and the Flowertots (Serbian: Fifi i cvetno društvo)
 Galactik Football (Serbian: Galaktički fudbal)
 Monster Buster Club (Serbian: Klub isterivača monstruma)
 Code Lyoko (Serbian: Kod Lioko)
 Code Lyoko: Evolution (Serbian: Kod Lioko - Evolucija)
 Growing Up Creepie (Serbian: Kripi)
 Lego Ninjago (Serbian: Nindžago)
 Lego Friends (Serbian: Lego prijatelji)
 LazyTown (Serbian: Lenji grad)
 Lilo and Stitch: The Series (Serbian: Lilo i Stič)
 A Kind of Magic (Serbian: Magična porodica)
 The Little Mermaid (Serbian: Mala sirena)
 Little-wolf (Serbian: Mali vuk)
 MÄR
 Masha and the Bear (Serbian: Maša i medved)
 Mia and Me (Serbian: Mia i ja)
 My Little Pony: Friendship is Magic (Serbian: Moj mali poni)
 Me and My Monsters (Serbian: Moja čudovišta i ja)
 Naruto
 Peppa Pig (Serbian: Pepa Prase)
 Deltora Quest (Serbian: Potraga za Deltorom)
 Mermaid Melody (Serbian: Princeze sirene)
 Fleabag Monkeyface (Serbian: Stiki majmunoliki)
 Totally Spies (Serbian: Super špijunke)
 Tickety Toc
 Team Galaxy
 In the Night Garden... (Serbian: U noćnoj bašti)
 Skip Beat (Serbian: U ritmu srca)
 Winx Club (Serbian: Vinks klub)
 Farmkids (Serbian: Životinjska farma)
 Kaeloo (Serbian: Žlabac)

Animated and live-action films 
 Aladdin (Serbian: Aladin)
 Atlantis: The Lost Empire (Serbian: Atlantida - Izgubljeno carstvo)
 Cars (Serbian: Automobili)
 Brother Bear (Serbian: Brat medved)
 A Bug's Life (Serbian: Bubice - Velika avantura)
 Monsters, Inc. (Serbian: Čudovište iz ormara)
 Dinosaur (Serbian: Dinosaurus)
Chicken Little (Serbian: Dosije pilence)
 Hercules (Serbian: Herkules)
 The Jungle Book 2 (Serbian: Knjiga o džungli 2)
 Lilo and Stitch (Serbian: Lilo i Stič)
 Ratatouille (Serbian: Mućkalica)
 Balto
 Mulan
 Mulan 2
 Return to Never Land (Serbian: Peter Pan 2 - Povratak u Nedođiju)
 Treasure Planet (Serbian: Planeta s blagom)
 Home on the Range (Serbian: Pobuna na farmi)
 Pocahontas (Serbian: Pokahontas)
 Toy Story (Serbian: Priča o igračkama)
 Toy Story 2 (Serbian: Priča o igračkama 2)
 A Goofy Movie (Serbian: Šiljin film)
 Tarzan
 Finding Nemo (Serbian: U potrazi za Nemo)
 The Hunchback of Notre Dame (Serbian: Zvonar Bogorodičine crkve)

Staff

Voice actors in dubbing 
 Aleksa Petrović
 Aleksa Stanilović
 Aleksandar Arsić
 Aleksandar Radojčić
 Aleksandra Bijelić
 Aleksandra Đurić
 Aleksandra Mladenović
 Aleksandra Ristović
 Aleksandra Širkić
 Aleksandra Tomić
 Ana Davidović Vajnberg
 Ana Marković
 Ana Milenković
 Ana Popović
 Ana Simić
 Anja Kostić
 Andrej Ostroški
 Andrej Rašeta
 Andrijana Oliverić
 Anka Gaćeša
 Bojan Lazarov
 Bojana Stefanović
 Bora Nenić
 Borka Tomović
 Branislav Platiša
 Branislav Zeremski

 Čarni Đerić

 Danica Todorović
 Danijel Sič
 Danina Jeftić
 Darko Tomović
 Dejan Dedić
 Dejan Lutkić
 Dobrila Ilić
 Dragana Milošević
 Dragana Zrnić
 Dubravko Jovanović
 Dunja Đorđević
 Dušica Novaković
 Duško Premović
 Đorđe Marković

 Feđa Stojanović
 Goran Jevtić
 Goran Popović

 Igor Borojević
 Iva Stefanović
 Ivan Bosiljčić
 Ivan Šarabajić
 Ivan Zarić
 Ivana Aleksandrović
 Ivana Vukčević
 Jakov Jevtović
 Jelena Đorđević
 Jelena Gavrilović
 Jelena Jovičić
 Jelena Petrović
 Jelena Stojiljković
 Jelisaveta Orašanin
 Jovana Cavnić
 Jovana Mišković
 Kaspar Vajnberg
 Lako Nikolić
 Lazar Dubovac
 Maja Šarenac
 Mariana Aranđelović
 Marija Dakić
 Marija Mihajlović
 Marija Stokić
 Marina Aleksić
 Marina Kutlešić
 Marina Vodeničar
 Marjan Apostolović
 Marko Gizdavić
 Marko Janjić
 Marko Marković
 Marko Mrđenović
 Marko Živić
 Matija Živković
 Mihailo Milidragović
 Mihailo Laptošević
 Mila Manojlović
 Miloš Anđelković
 Miloš Pjevač
 Miloš Živković
 Mina Nenadović
 Milan Antonić
 Milan Čučilović
 Milan Milosavljević
 Milan Tubić
 Milena Moravčević
 Milena Živanović
 Milica Čalija
 Miloš Čučilović
 Miloš Đuričić
 Mladen Andrejević
 Mladena Veselinović
 Nataša Balog
 Nataša Popović 
 Nemanja Oliverić
 Nenad Heraković
 Nenad Nenadović
 Nenad Stojmenović
 Nikola Bulatović
 Nina Lazarević

 Paulina Manov
 Pavle Jerinić
 Peđa Damnjanović
 Petar Benčina
 Predrag Đorđević
 Rade Ćosić
 Rade Knežević
 Radovan Vujović
 Sandra Spasovska
 Sanja Popović
 Sara Avramovski
 Saša Kuzmanović
 Siniša Ubović
 Slobodan Boda Ninković
 Snežana Knežević
 Snežana Nešković
 Sofija Jevremović
 Sofija Juričan
 Srboljub Milin
 Srđan Jovanović
 Stefan Buzurović
 Stefan Kapičić
 Suzana Lukić

 Tamara Dragičević
 Teodora Živanović
 Tomaš Sarić

 Valentina Pavličić
 Vanja Lazin
 Veljko Racić
 Vesna Stanković
 Vladan Milić
 Vladan Živković
 Vladimir Tešović
 Vuk Gajić
 Zoran Ćosić
 Zorana Milošaković
 Željko Aleksić
 Željko Maksimović

Producers 
 Bojan Puača
 Damjan Dašić
 Darko Obradović
 Dunja Đorđević
 Đurđica Gajić
 Igor Borojević
 Igor Jadranin
 Ivana Aleksandrović Ivee
 Marko Majer
 Nemanja Kojić
 Radovan Spasojević
 Slađana Crnić
 Slađana Dimitrijević
 Svetlana Beba Crnić
 Tatjana Gvozdenović
 Tijana Vujović
 Vladan Đokić
 Vladimir Zdunić
 Vukašin Vukotić
 Zoran Timotijević
 Željko Markuš

References 

Companies based in Belgrade
Entertainment companies established in 2001